Guava Lamp was a gay bar and nightclub in Neartown, Houston, in the U.S. state of Texas. It closed in 2020 after 22 years of operation.

The Pride Superstar, in which contestants sang for a prize, began at Guava Lamp.

References

External links
 

2020 disestablishments in Texas
Defunct nightclubs in Texas
Impact of the COVID-19 pandemic on the LGBT community
LGBT culture in Houston
Neartown, Houston